Martin James Tenni (4 April 1934 – 20 October 2019) was an Australian politician. He was a Member of the Queensland Legislative Assembly.

Early life

Martin Tenni was born on 4 April 1934 in Cairns, the son of Henry Tenni and Francis May, née Reed. After attending state schools in the Cairns area, he underwent national service training in 1952 before entering the hardware business, eventually managing his own company.

Politics
A member of the National Party, Tenni was a member of the Mareeba Shire Council from 1970 to 1976 (chairman from 1973 to 1976).

In 1974 he was elected to the Queensland Legislative Assembly as the member for Barron River. In 1983 he was promoted to the front bench as Minister for Environment, Valuation and Administrative Services. He was moved to Water Resources and Maritime Services in 1986 and to Mines and Energy in 1987, adding Northern Development in 1989. He resigned from parliament on 10 November 1989.

References

1934 births
2019 deaths
People from Cairns
National Party of Australia members of the Parliament of Queensland
Members of the Queensland Legislative Assembly